The R546 is a Regional Route in South Africa that connects Kinross with Vrede via Evander and Standerton.

Route
Its northern terminus is in Kinross, Mpumalanga, at a junction with the R29. It is initially co-signed with the R547 southwards for a small distance before the R547 becomes its own road to the south-south-west, while the R546 heads south. Just after, it crosses the N17 Highway. It passes by Evander, where it meets the south-western terminus of the R580 Road from Secunda.

From Evander, it goes southwards for 54 km, passing through the township of Embalenhle and the village of Charl Cilliers, to Standerton. Here, it meets the south-eastern terminus of the R50 from Pretoria/Delmas and the south-western terminus of the R39 from Ermelo. After meeting the R50 and R39, it goes south through the Standerton Central Business District to intersect with the R23 Road coming from Heidelberg. The R546 and R23 become one road southwards as Walter Sisulu Drive, then south-east as Nelson Mandela Drive, to cross the Vaal River into the suburb of Meyerville, where the R546 becomes its own road south-west as George Street while the R23 remains on the south-easterly road.

The R546 continues southwards for 56 km, crossing into the Free State, to enter the town of Vrede, where the route ends at an intersection with the R34.

References

Regional Routes in the Free State (province)
Regional Routes in Mpumalanga